Nasseruddin and similar names may refer to:

 Nasruddin Khan, the last ruler of Kokand
 Naser al-Din Shah Qajar, known as Nasseruddin Shah, a ruler of Persia
 Naseeruddin Shah, an Indian filmmaker